Stare Kurowo  is a village in Strzelce-Drezdenko County, Lubusz Voivodeship, in western Poland. It is the seat of the gmina (administrative district) called Gmina Stare Kurowo.

The village has a population of 2,100.

References

Stare Kurowo